Cacheu is a town in northwestern Guinea-Bissau, lying on the Cacheu River. Its population was estimated to be 9,849 .

History and landmarks

The town of Cacheu is situated in territory of the Papel people. The name is of Bainuk origin: "i.e. Caticheu, meaning 'the place where we rest'."

Founded in 1588, Cacheu was one of the earliest European colonial settlements in sub-saharan Africa, due to its strategic location on the Cacheu river. Cacheu developed a European/Afro-European population from the late fifteenth century through informal settlement of Cape Verdian and Portuguese traders, adventurers and outcasts (lançados). The authorities in mainland Portugal also sent to Cacheu degredados - people condemned to exile for a variety of offences.

For most of the seventeenth and eighteenth centuries, Cacheu was the official slave trading point for the Portuguese in the Upper Guinea region - the point at which the Portuguese crown endeavoured to ensure that duties on all slaves exported were paid. Multiple companies were established to facilitate the trade of slaves from Cacheu to the New World, including that of the Company of Cacheu and Rivers and Commerce of Guinea.

Notable buildings in Cacheu include the Portuguese-built 16th century fort, dating from the period when Cacheu was a centre for the slave trade.

Cacheu Today
Roads in the town are paved with oil palm kernels. Other attractions in the town include the Tarafes de Cacheu Natural Park mangrove swamp and a regular market.

International relations

Twin towns – Sister cities
Cacheu is twinned with:

 Lisbon, Portugal

References

 
Cacheu Region
Populated places in Guinea-Bissau
Former Portuguese colonies
Sectors of Guinea-Bissau
Populated places established in 1588